Haj Mulla Basim Ismail Muhammad-Ali al-Karbalaei (born 11 November 1966), commonly known as Basim Karbalaei or Mulla Basim is an Iraqi Shi'ite eulogy reciter.

al-Karbalaei's voice and performance is considered particularly distinctive, the former is considered one of the most compelling instruments in the history of lamentations for the Ahl al-Bayt. His vocal abilities have allowed him to be identified as one of the greatest voices in the Arab world, widely heard by audiences all across the globe.

His choice of poetry, melodies, performances, were able to attract millions of listeners, allowing them to abandon the types of music that are religiously forbidden. al-Karbalaei managed to fill a void for them, by continuously introducing new methods and styles in his recitations. He has also produced works languages other than Arabic, like Persian, Urdu and English. al-Karbalaei, for the most of it, has been apolitical with his elegies, trying to keep his elegies exclusively about the Ahl al-Bayt and their memory.

In 2019, al-Karbalaei was gifted with a crown made of pure gold, and dubbed Sultan al-Minbar al-Hussaini (sultan of the Husayni pulpit), by the Hussaini Reciters Association in Kadhimiya. He later donated the crown to the Abbas shrine museum.

Early life 
al-Karbalaei was born in Karbala, to Ismail al-Karbalaei, and Siddiqa al-Tukmachi. He is the fourth of seven children. Whilst in Karbala, he was inspired by senior eulogy reciter Hamza al-Zighayir, and participated in his majalis (plu. mourning gatherings), until he died in 1976.

In 1980, al-Karbalaei and his family emigrated to Iran, fleeing Bathist persecution. He lived in Isfahan, near his mother's family, and it was his uncle Rasool al-Tukmachi, who discovered al-Karbalaei's talent and began to encourage him to recite praises and lamentations in memory of the Ahl al-Bayt. He was then taken under the wing of a Mulla Taqi, who began taking him to the Husayniya; established by the people of Karbala who resided in Isfahan, to participate in. The first ever eulogy he recited was Taj al-Sa'ada Lel Yiwali Haidar, by renowned late poet, Kadhim Manthoor.

al-Karbalaei, then began to recite in different cities across Iran, at Husayniya's established by the Iraqi community. In Isfahan, he learns the Quran and its sounds well for five years. Then he goes to a person named Mullah Taghi Karbalaei to ask him for help. Bassem learns some poems from (Mullah Taghi Karbalaei). His name quickly spread between the congregations, and began to attract the youth to his majalis, and through listening to him, they would cultivate pious sensibilities.

al-Karbalaei began reciting eulogies mainly written by Muhammad-Ridha Fatthallah. However, after the death of Fatthallah, he was introduced to Jaber al-Kadhimi. al-Karbalaei and al-Kadhimi got on very well, and whilst the former was considered to be a talented reciter, the latter was considered one of the best poets of that time. It was here that a long relationship began, where they would produce modern melodies and lyrics, straying away from the traditional tunes and poetry that were recited before them.

The first ten nights of Muharram (that are spent retelling the story of the murder of Hussain, his family and his companions on Ashura) are considered second only to Ramadan in its significance, and its considered the largest in congregation compared to other mourning seasons, and every Shia eulogy reciter dreams of hosting these ten nights, and al-Karbalaei's first ten night function was in 1988, in Qom. That year witnessed the beginning of al-Karbalaei's recognition as a capable reciter. 

In 2020 due to Covid-19 pandemic he was infected with the virus and unfortunately he could not read for the first ten nights of Muharram because of the pandemic, but in muharram 2021 he started reading again after he recovered and the COVID-19 crisis receded.

Career 
In 1994, al-Karbalaei was invited to recite for the first ten nights of Muharram in Kuwait. His majalis were recorded onto tape cassettes and distributed across the Islamic world. This allowed exposure on a much larger scale, and gained him international recognition. He also began to receive invitations in other countries, as close as Lebanon and as far as Australia. He took residence in Kuwait, moving with his family.

Following the advise of his mentor, Muhammad Ridha al-Shirazi, he formed a group of aspiring reciters, called Shabab al-Thaqalayn, which was an ensemble of eighty youth, similar to a choir. This group often participated in auspicious functions celebrating the births of the Ahl al-Bayt. The group produced a notable amount of senior reciters.

Upon many invitations, al-Karbalaei's visited Bahrain for the first time in 2002, for the first ten nights of Muharram. This was also the first time al-Karbalaei he was going to leave Kuwait in Muharram, after performing there for eight consecutive years. This proved a new challenge for al-Karbalaei, since the people of Bahrain had a slightly different approach when it came to the culture of latom (chest beating). He managed to quickly cope and accommodate to their metre, earning the recognition as a true innovator in the eulogy reciter's world.

After the invasion of Iraq in 2003, al-Karbalaei visited Iraq, after being separated from his homeland for just over twenty-three years. He was welcomed greatly by his fellow countrymen. Majalis were hosted for him, in each of the holy sites, with crowds reaching up to hundreds of thousands. However, al-Karbalaei did not remain in Iraq for too long and returned to Kuwait, whilst still focusing on his performances across the globe. He spent the next couple of years of between Manama and London for Muharram, and other Arab and Western countries for the other seasons. Eventually in 2007, he left Kuwait altogether, to settle in his wife's hometown, in Oman.

Media 
al-Karbalaei is the first Shia eulogy reciter to produce a kasida (elegy) in a studio. His first production was a feature in a project with Dawood Hussein, called al-mubahila. After that, he went to produce over sixty albums, consisting of seven to ten tracks each. He was also the first reciter to release a music video. In the late 1990s and early 2000s, he saw a huge success in album sales in Kuwait, Bahrain, Saudi and Lebanon. In 2003, after the Iraq invasion, when religious repression was lifted from the Shias, religious songs became a sought for commodity. Music stores across the country would declare that in ordinary days, people would buy ten Basim CD's to one Kadhim al-Sahir CD, as for during religious seasons, sales of Basim CDs would significantly increase. Gradually, al-Karbalaei's media presence and following became huge, his Youtube channel began to show for this, with more than eight million subscribers and over two billion video views.

al-Karbalaei has appeared on numerous state television channels, such as Bahrain, Lebanon and Iraq, and his sound tracks are constantly aired. He frequently appears on satellite channels.

Works 
al-Karbalaei has authored three volumes of his book Hatha Ma Qara't (This Is What I Have Recited), which is a compilation of the elegies he has recited across his career.

Personal life 
al-Karbalaei is married to an Omani woman. He has four children, a son (Ali) and three daughters (Fatima, Rayhanah and Roghayeh). His daughter Fatima, participated in his album Sawad al-Layl, in 2007, while his son Ali and daughter Roghayeh, began participating in albums with their father in 2013 until 2017.

Muharram Participations 
{| class="wikitable"
|+Muharram Participation's
!Gregorian Year
!Lunar Year
!Organisation
!Location
!Highlight Eulogy
(Video on YouTube)
|-
|1988
|1409
|Masjid al-Imam al-Husayn
|Qom, Iran
|Yikfi al-Hadhum Wil Nowh
|-
|1989
|1410
|al-Husayniya al-Zaynabiya
|Qom, Iran
|Lo Ridit Husn al-Aqiba
|-
|1990
|1411
|Husayniat al-Imam Ali
|Damascus, Syria
|Kilmen Yihasib Dhamira
|-
|1991
|1412
|al-Husayniya al-Zaynabiya
|Qom, Iran
|Goom Irwiha
|-
|1992
|1413
|al-Husayniya al-Zaynabiya
|Qom, Iran
|Ma Nidri Ya Walina
|-
|1993
|1414
|al-Husayniya al-Zaynabiya
|Qom, Iran
|Mahla al-Wida' al-Yawm
|-
|1994
|1415
|Husayniyat al-Rasool al-Adham - al-Karbalaeia/
Husayniyat Sayid Muhammad
|Kuwait
|Dhal Yijri Dam' al-Eyn
|-
|1995
|1416
|Husayniyat al-Rasool al-Adham - al-Karbalaeia
|Kuwait
|Hayarni al-Wakit
|-
|1996
|1417
|Husayniyat al-Rasool al-Adham - al-Karbalaeia
|Kuwait
|Tikshifha Tikshifha
|-
|1997
|1418
|Husayniyat al-Rasool al-Adham - al-Karbalaeia
|Kuwait
|al-Akbar Nisim'a
|-
|1998
|1419
|Husayniyat al-Rasool al-Adham - al-Karbalaeia
|Kuwait
|Zilim Wikhyool
|-
|1999
|1420
|Husayniyat al-Rasool al-Adham - al-Karbalaeia
|Kuwait
|al-Alam Al Gaa' Ya Haidar
|-
|2000
|1421
|Husayniyat al-Rasool al-Adham - al-Karbalaeia
|Kuwait
|Gabul Metrooh Withajir
|-
|2001
|1422
|Husayniyat al-Rasool al-Adham - al-Karbalaeia
|Kuwait
|Ilak Galbi Infija''']
|-
|2002
|1423
|Husayniyat al-Qasab
|Manama, Bahrain
|Rayhanat al-Mustafa
|-
|2003
|1424
|Husayniyat al-Qasab
|Manama, Bahrain
|Yal Gasid Gabr Ihssain
|-
|2004
|1425
|Husayniyat al-Qasab
|Manama, Bahrain
|Bil Khiyma Farha
|-
|2005
|1426
|Al-Hussaini Association
|London, UK
|Ma A'lam Ibya Yawm
|-
|2006
|1427
|Al-Hussaini Association
|London, UK
|[https://www.youtube.com/watch?v=1utrtMQjcyo&feature=youtu.be&t=1190 Hatha Inta Yabn al-Kerrar|-
|2007
|1428
|Al-Hussaini Association
|London, UK
|Ya Galbi Ya Sabir
|-
|2008
|1429
|Husayniyat al-Qasab
|Manama, Bahrain
|Ilahi Rid Gharib al-Dar
|-
|2009 (Jan)
|1430
|Husayniyat al-Rasool al-Adham - al-Karbalaeia
|Kuwait
|Yahssain Awal Ma Habeyna
|-
|2009 (Dec)
|1431
|Husayniyat al-Rasool al-Adham - al-Karbalaeia
|London, UK
|Ashofak Kil Fajir
|-
|2010
|1432
|Husayniyat al-Rasool al-Adham - al-Karbalaeia
|Kuwait
|ِ Ana al-Qahir|-
|2011
|1433
|Husayniyat Dawood al-Ashoor
|Basra, Iraq
|Dumti Karbala
|-
|2012
|1434
|Husayniyat Ashor
|Kuwait
|Ghadhab Rab al-Ibad|-
|2013
|1435
|Husayniyat Dawood al-Ashoor
|Basra, Iraq
|La Tinsa al-Wasiya
|-
|2014
|1436
|Husayniyat Dawood al-Ashoor
|Basra, Iraq
|Kil Ma Ashoofak
|-
|2015
|1437
|Husayniyat Dawood al-Ashoor
|Basra, Iraq
|Gooman Banat al-Nabi
|-
|2016
|1438
|Husayniyat Dawood al-Ashoor
|Basra, Iraq
|Yuma Atamnich Alaya
|-
|2017
|1439
|Husayniyat Dawood al-Ashoor
|Basra, Iraq
|Yabu Fadhil
|-
|2018
|1440
|Al-Akbar Foundation
|London, UK
|Beyn al-Mehdi Wil Abbas
|-
|2019
|1441
|Al-Akbar Foundation/Dewan al-Kafeel
|London, UK
|Ballah Ya Nahar
|-
|2021
|1443
|Hey'at Jawad al-A'immah
|Al-Aziziyah, Iraq
|Solaf Waya Chaffa|-
|2022
|1444
|Qaat Baghdad al-Kubra
|Baghdad, Iraq
|Tijaz Ya May|}

 Discography 
 Studio albums Wa Fatimatah (O Fatima) (1993) [Um al-Banin Foundation]Wa Tabqa Lana (It Remains For Us) (2000) [Um al-Banin Foundation]Ya Hussain (O' Husayn) (2002) [Karbala Records]Labayk Ya Husayn (Here We Are O' Husayn) (2003) [Karbala Records]al-Razaya (The Tragedies) (2003) [Karbala  Records]al-Imam al-Hassan al-Masmoom (Imam Hassan the Poisoned) [Fadak Records]al-Zahra Fi Karbala (Zahra in Karbala) (2004) [Karbala  Records]Al-Adl al-Samawi (Justice of the Skies) (2004) [Aniss al-Nofoss]Ya Fatima (O' Fatima) (2004) [Karbala  Records]Bintu Muhammad (Muhammad's Daughter) (2004) [al-Thaqalayn Records]Wali Allah (Guardian of Allah) (2004) [al-Thaqalayn Records]Awdat al-Sabaya (Return of the Captives) (2004) [Karbala Records]Nowh Iw Dami (Wails and Tears) (2004) [al-Thaqalayn Records]Karbala (2005) [Karbala Records]Mata al-Multaqa (When Is The Meeting) (2005) [al-Thaqalayn Records]Uqsuduni (Come to Me) (2005) [Karbala  Records]Baad Ma Ashufak (I Will Not See You Again) (2006) [Anwar al-Huda Records]Wahi al-Qawafi (Soul of the Words) (2006) [al-Thaqalayn Records]Qaws al-Sama' (Bow of the Sky) (2006) [Karbala Records]Ya Bab Fatima (O' Door of Fatima) (2006) [Karbala Records]Usali Alayka (I Pray Upon You) (2007) [al-Hayat Media]Kalim al-Husayn (He Who Speaks to Husayn) (2007) [Thulfqiar Centre]Sawad al-Layl (The Darkness of the Night) (2007) [al-Faqih Library]Wujudun Li Wujudi (Presence To My Presence) (2007) [ِAnwar al-Huda]Sarab (Oasis) (2007) [al-Thaqalayn Records]Lahn al-Dima (The Melody of Blood) (2008) [al-Hayat Media]Lil Bukaa Baqiya (There Is Still Time To Mourn) (January, 2008) [al-Hayat Media]Kahf al-Wara (The Cave of the World) (January, 2008) [al-Thaqalayn Records]Sawt al-Rayah (The Voice of the Banner) (February, 2008) [al-Raya al-Imamiya]Bani Hashim (January, 2009) [al-Thaqalayn Records]Ayat al-Sabr (Verse of Patience) (January, 2009) [Anwar al-Huda)al-Mahkamah (The Court) (February, 2009) [al-Raya al-Imamiya]Shajar al-Arak (Tree of Arak) (December, 2009) [al-Faqih Library]Inaha Taqool (She Says) (December, 2009) [BK Media]Qul Ma Tasha (Say What You Like) (December, 2010) [al-Thaqalayn Records]Ra'ayt al-Husayn (I Saw Husayn) (December, 2010) [Anwar al-Huda]Uthama (Greats) (June, 2010) [Thulfiqar Centre]Tezuruni (You Visit Me) (January, 2011) [Karbala Records]Shams (Sun) (November, 2011) [al-Ahrar Media]Laka Antami (I Belong To You) (November, 2011) [ِAnwar al-Huda]Yisajelny (He Registers Me) (December, 2011) [BK Media]Majaninak (Your Insanes) (November, 2012) [BK Media]Kuntu Wala Zilt (I Was, And Remain) (November, 2012) [BK Media]Uthama 2 (Greats 2) (July, 2013) [Thulfiqar Centre]Hathihi al-Hikaya (This Story) (November, 2013) [BK Media]Tilka al-Sarkha (That Scream) (November, 2013) [BK Media]Qaedona al-Husayn (Our Leader is Husayn) (October, 2014) [BK Media]Salla al-Mawt (Death Prayed) (October, 2014) [BK Media]Maat al-Maa (Water is Dead) (October, 2015) [BK Media]Yawm al-Arbaeen (The Day of Arbaeen) (November, 2015) [BK Media]Banat al-Nabi (Daughters of the Prophet) (September, 2016) [BK Media]Basim (September, 2017) [BK Media]1440 (September , 2018) [BK Media]1443 (July , 2021) [BK Media]1444 (July , 2022) [BK Media]

 References 

 External links 

Official website

Hatha Ma Qara't Vol. 1 by al-Fikr E-Book NetworkLamentations Sound Library by ShiaVoicePraises Sound Library by ShiaVoice''

1967 births
Living people
Iraqi Shia Muslims
People from Karbala
Iraqi composers
21st-century Iraqi male singers
20th-century Iraqi male singers